Los Angeles Forum: April 26, 1969 is a live album by the Jimi Hendrix Experience. It was recorded during the group's last North American tour and includes a mix of popular Experience album songs along with some instrumentals. The album is the first full live release by the trio with Hendrix, Noel Redding, and Mitch Mitchell since 2013's Miami Pop Festival.

Experience Hendrix and Sony Music's Legacy Recordings released it as a double record album and CD on November 18, 2022. It is the first time that the entire concert is available on an official album.  Longtime Hendrix audio engineer Eddie Kramer mixed the recordings, which were "sourced directly from the original eight-track master tapes", according to Experience Hendrix.

Background
Since forming in October 1966, the Jimi Hendrix Experience released three
highly successful albums and toured extensively throughout Europe and North America. By 1969, the group had become one of the few rock attractions "with enough drawing power to sell out huge venues like the Forum and New York's Madison Square Garden". In April 1969, they began yet another American tour. Experience manager Michael Jeffery arranged for Wally Heider (who had recorded the Experience at Monterey Pop in 1967) to record some shows.  After promising performances at the Forum on April 26 and San Diego Sports Arena on May 24, Eddie Kramer arrived at Heider's Hollywood studios to prepare mixes from the multitrack recordings.

Jeffery was hoping to use a live album to satisfy a contract dispute with a former Hendrix manager. Kramer and Hendrix spent three days at Heider's studio, "assembled a superb album of live performances", and delivered the tapes to Jeffery.  However, nothing was forthcoming and by June 15, 1969, plans for a live album were dropped.  In later years, the Forum concert recordings were released piecemeal: "Foxey Lady" was added as a bonus track on the 1989 CD-reissue of The Jimi Hendrix Concerts (1982) and the following year, the rest of the tracks were included on disc four of Lifelines: The Jimi Hendrix Story box set.  
Other releases include "Red House" on Variations on a Theme: Red House (1992); "I Don't Live Today" on The Jimi Hendrix Experience (2000) box set and the Voodoo Child: The Jimi Hendrix Collection (2001) compilation; and The "Star Spangled Banner" and "Purple Haze" on West Coast Seattle Boy: The Jimi Hendrix Anthology (2010).

Performance
In 1969, rock concerts at large indoor venues, such as the Forum, were relatively new. It was also a time of social unrest and popular concert events attracted their share of difficulties. Hendrix biographer Keith Shadwick commented, "As so often there was a troubled atmosphere in the arena reflecting the turmoil that continued to dominate America's social and political life; here it was exacerbated by the security personnel's reaction to  provocation from unruly elements in the crowd." In an effort to prevent the capacity crowd from rushing the stage, "the cops had lined up on the stage in front of him [Hendrix], in some mysterious police method of crowd control". 

Tensions heightened and those in charge threatened to cut the power; Hendrix announced "Look, they're going to cut the show short if this keeps up. So just sit down and be cool so these other 'people' [coughs] will get off the stage." During his performance of "Purple Haze", he changed scuse me while I kiss the sky" to scuse me while I kiss that policeman". Some see his attempts as sarcasm, however, Shadwick feels that with humor and common sense, Hendrix "repeatedly defuses a situation where more heavy-handed methods would only make things worse".

Also, by 1969, difficulties between Experience bassist Noel Redding and Hendrix were coming to a head. Hendrix had played bass on several songs that appeared on Axis: Bold As Love (1967 and Electric Ladyland (1968), and invited other musicians to record on the latter.  In his autobiography, Redding expressed his increasing frustration with Hendrix's habit of showing up late for recording sessions, sometimes accompanied by a group of hangers-on, and generally not being supportive of his role in the group.  Redding responded in part by forming his own band, Fat Mattress, where he returned to playing guitar, instead of bass.  During the Forum concert, Redding's approach to dealing with the security issue also showed the growing division, with his angry comments at odds with Hendrix's more conciliatory approach. After riots during performances in San Diego (May 24) and Denver (June 29), Redding quit the Experience and returned to England.

Critical reception

AllMusic reviewer Mark Deming gave the album a rating of four out of five stars. He writes:

Track listing

Personnel
Jimi Hendrixguitar, vocals
Mitch Mitchelldrums
Noel Reddingbass, backing vocals

Charts

Notes

References

Bibliography

Jimi Hendrix live albums
2022 live albums
Albums recorded at the Forum